Berglas is a surname, likely of Jewish origin. Notable people with the surname include:
 David Berglas (born 1926), British magician and mentalist
 Eitan Berglas (1934–1992), Israeli economist and banker